Abū al-Faraj Muḥammad ibn Isḥāq al-Nadīm, also ibn Abī Ya'qūb Isḥāq ibn Muḥammad ibn Isḥāq al-Warrāq,  and commonly known by the nasab (patronymic) Ibn al-Nadīm (died 17 September 995 or 998) was a Muslim bibliographer and biographer of Baghdad who compiled the encyclopedia Kitāb al-Fihrist (The Book Catalogue).

Biography
Much known of al-Nadim is deduced from his epithets. 'Al-Nadim', 'the Court Companion' and 'al-Warrāq 'the copyist of manuscripts'. Probably born in Baghdad ca. 320/932 he died there on Wednesday, 20th of Shaʿban A.H. 385. He was a Persian or perhaps an Arab.
From age six, he may have attended a madrasa and received comprehensive education in Islamic studies, history, geography, comparative religion, the sciences, grammar, rhetoric and Qurʾanic commentary. Ibrahim al-Abyari, author of Turāth al-Insaniyah says al-Nadim studied with al-Hasan ibn Sawwar, a logician and translator of science books; Yunus al-Qass, translator of classical mathematical texts; and Abu al-Hasan Muhammad ibn Yusuf al-Naqit, scholar in Greek science.
An inscription, in an early copy of al-Fihrist, probably by the historian al-Maqrizi, relates that al-Nadim was a pupil of the jurist Abu Sa'id al-Sirafi (d.978/9), the poet Abu al-Faraj al-Isfahani, and the historian Abu Abdullah al-Marzubani and others.  Al-Maqrizi's phrase 'but no one quoted him', would imply al-Nadim himself did not teach. While attending lectures of some of the leading scholars of the tenth century, he served an apprenticeship in his father's profession, the book trade. His father, a bookdealer and owner of a prosperous bookstore, commissioned al-Nadim to buy manuscripts from dealers.  Al-Nadim, with the other calligrapher scribes employed, would then copy these for the customers. The bookshop, customarily on an upper floor, would have been a popular hangout for intellectuals.

He probably visited the intellectual centers at Basra and Kufa in search of scholarly material.  He may have visited Aleppo, a center of literature and culture under the rule of Sayf al-Dawla. In a library in Mosul he found a fragment of a book by Euclid and works of poetry.  Al-Nadim may have served as 'Court Companion' to Nasir al-Dawla,  a Hamdanid ruler of Mosul who promoted learning. His family were highly educated and he, or his ancestor, may have been a 'member of the Round Table of the prince'. The Buyid caliph 'Adud al-Dawla (r. 356–367 H), was the great friend of arts and sciences, loved poets and scholars, gave them salaries, and founded a significant library. More probably service at the court of Mu'izz al-Dawla, and later his son Izz al-Dawlah's, in Baghdad, earned him the title. He mentions meeting someone in Dar al-Rum in 988, about the period of the book's compilation. However, it is probable that, here, 'Dar al-Rum' refers to the Greek Orthodox sector of Baghdad rather than Constantinople.

Others among his wide circle of elites were Ali ibn Harun ibn al-Munajjim (d. 963), of the Banu Munajjim and the Christian philosopher Ibn al-Khammar. He admired Abu Sulayman Sijistani, son of Ali bin Isa the "Good Vizier" of the Banu al-Jarrah, for his knowledge of philosophy, logic and the Greek, Persian and Indian sciences, especially Aristotle.  The physician Ibn Abi Usaibia (d. 1273), mentions al-Nadim thirteen times and calls him a writer, or perhaps a government secretary. Al-Nadim's kunya 'Abu al-Faraj' indicates he was married with at least one son.

In 987, Ibn al-Nadim began compiling al-Fihrist (The Catalogue), as a useful reference index for customers and traders of books. Over a long period he noted thousands of authors, their biographical data, and works, gathered from his regular visits to private book collectors and libraries across the region - including Mosul and Damascus - and through active participation in the lively literary scene of Baghdad in the period.

Religion
Ishaq al-Nadim's broad discussions of religions and religious sects in his writings and the subtleties of his descriptions and terminologies raised questions as to his own religious beliefs and affiliations.  It seems Ibn Hajar's claim that al-Nadim was Shiʿah, was based on his use of the term specific people for the Shiʿah,  general people for non-Shiʿahs, and of the pejorative term Ḥashawīyya, for Sunnis. Reinforcing this suspicion are references to the Hanbali school as Ahl al-Hadith ("People of the Hadith"), and not Ahl al-Sunna ("People of the Tradition"), use of the supplication of peace be upon him after the names of the Ahl al-Bayt (Descendants of Muhammad) and reference to the Shia imam Ali ar-Rida as mawlana (master). He alleges that al-Waqidi concealed being a Shiʿah by taqiyya (dissimulation) and that most of the traditionalists were Zaydis.  Ibn Hajar also claimed al-Nadim was a Muʿtazila. The sect is discussed in chapter five of Al-Fihrist where they are called the People of Justice.  Al-Nadim calls  the Ash'arites al-Mujbira, and harshly criticises the Sab'iyya doctrine and history. An allusion to a certain Shafi'i scholar as a 'secret Twelver', is said to indicate his possible Twelver affiliation. Within his circle were the theologian Al-Mufid, the da'i Ibn Hamdan, the author Khushkunanadh, and the Jacobite philosopher Yahya ibn 'Adi (d. 363/973) preceptor to Isa bin Ali and a fellow copyist and bookseller (p. t64, 8). Another unsubstantiated claim that al-Nadim was Isma'ili, rests on his meeting with an Isma'ili leader.

Al-Fihrist

The Kitāb al-Fihrist is a compendium of the knowledge and literature of tenth-century Islam referencing approx. 10,000 books and 2,000 authors. This crucial source of medieval Arabic-Islamic literature, informed by various ancient Hellenic and Roman civilizations, preserves from his own hand the names of authors, books and accounts otherwise entirely lost. Al-Fihrist is evidence of Al-Nadim's thirst for knowledge among the exciting sophisticated milieu of Baghdad's intellectual elite. As a record of civilisation transmitted through Muslim culture to the West world, it provides unique classical material and links to other civilisations.

See also
 Al-Shaykh Al-Mufid

Notes

References

Sources
[complete English translation].

  
 

 

990s deaths
History of education in Iraq
Baghdad under the Abbasid Caliphate
10th-century historians from the Abbasid Caliphate
10th-century Arabs
10th-century jurists
10th-century manuscripts
10th-century philosophers
10th-century scholars
10th-century Arabic writers
Alchemists of the medieval Islamic world
Bibliographers
Bibliophiles
Grammarians of Arabic
Encyclopedists of the medieval Islamic world
Nadim
Persian-language writers
Social history of Iraq
Translators of One Thousand and One Nights
Year of birth unknown
Iranian chemists